AP2 or variant, may refer to:

Biochemistry
 Activating protein 2 (AP-2), a mammalian transcription factor
 Adipocyte protein 2 (aP2), a carrier protein for fatty acids
 AP2 adaptors (AP-2 complex), which aid clathrin mediated endocytosis
 Apetala 2 (AP2), a plant transcription factor

Vehicles and transportation
 Automotive products AP2, Automatic transmission used in the minimatic, mini, metro, allegro and 1100/1300 road vehicles.
 Autopista AP-2, a roadway in Spain
 Seversky AP-2, a U.S. interwar patrol fighter plane
 , a U.S. Navy WWII transport ship
 Honda S2000 AP2, a variant of the Honda S2000 automobile

Other uses
 Amiga Power, the follow-up website to Amiga gaming magazine
 Argyle Park, industrial/experimental band

See also

 Automotive Products, a manufacturer of automatic transmissions in UK
 AP (disambiguation)
 APP (disambiguation)
 APAP (disambiguation)
 2AP (disambiguation)